Ignacio Huett (born 3 March 1972 in Caracas, Venezuela) artistically known as Nacho Huett, is a Venezuelan television actor, compositor, and stage actor. He is best known in his native country for working in Radio Caracas Televisión's telenovelas. Huett has been based in Bogota, Colombia since 2016, with his wife, actress Nacarid Escalona and their two daughters.

Filmography

Film roles

Television roles

References

External links 
 

1972 births
Living people
Venezuelan male film actors
Venezuelan male telenovela actors
Venezuelan male television actors